Ralph Waldo Gerard (7 October 1900 – 17 February 1974) was an American neurophysiologist and behavioral scientist known for his wide-ranging work on the nervous system, nerve metabolism, psychopharmacology, and biological basis of schizophrenia.

Biography
Gerard was born in Harvey, Illinois. He was a grandson of Rabbi Yaakov Gesundheit and a cousin of investor Benjamin Graham. Gerard was an uncommon intellectual and was encouraged in science by his father Maurice Gerard, who received an engineering degree in England, then moved to America to work as an engineering consultant. Maurice encouraged Ralph in mathematics and chess. In his teens, Ralph beat the American chess champion playing simultaneous matches in Chicago. He completed high school in two years and entered the University of Chicago at age fifteen.<ref>Seymour S. Ketty, Ralph Waldo Gerard, October 7, 1900 - February 17, 1974, in: Biographical Memoirs V.53, National Academy of Sciences, 1982, p. 178</ref> Ralph was a member of the Pi Lambda Phi fraternity.

In Chicago, Gerard studied chemistry and physiology. In chemistry, he was influenced by Julius Stieglitz and in physiology and neurophysiology he was influenced by Anton Carlson and Ralph Lillie. He received his B.S. degree in 1919, and a doctorate in physiology in 1921 at the University of Chicago. Shortly thereafter he married the psychiatrist Margaret Wilson, who had just  completed her doctorate in neuroanatomy. She became an outstanding practitioner of child psychiatry until her death in 1954. Gerard started as professor of physiology at the University of South Dakota, but returned to the Rush Medical College to finish his medical training where he received his M.D. degree in 1925. Afterwards he went to Europe on a National Research Council Fellowship for two years to work in biophysics and biochemistry with A. V. Hill in London and Otto Meyerhof in Kiel.

He returned to the University of Chicago in 1928 where he worked in the Department of Physiology until 1952. For two years he was professor of neurophysiology and physiology in the College of Medicine, at the University of Illinois. During the Second World War he was seconded to do classified research at the Edgewood Arsenal.

In 1954 Gerard was Fellow at the Center for Advanced Study in the Behavioral Sciences in Stanford California. In January 1955 he married Leona Bachrach Chalkley, whom he had known since high school. They moved to the University of Michigan in Ann Arbor, where he helped to establish the Mental Health Research Institute. In the next years, the institute grew to be one of the outstanding behavioral and psychiatric research centers of the nation.

In the last phase of his active career he concentrated on education. He helped to organize the newly forming Irvine campus of the University of California, and became the first Dean of its Graduate Division until his retirement in 1970. Even in this phase Gerard did not abandon his love of the neurosciences; he initiated the activities, under the auspices of the National Academy of Sciences, which led to the founding of the highly successful Society for Neuroscience. He was made Honorary President of this Society. At age seventy he retired, thence dedicating his time to civil affairs.

Gerard received many honors, including a medal from Charles University in Prague, the Order of the White Lion (4th class) of Czechoslovakia, honorary membership in the American Psychiatric Association and the Pan Hellenic Medical Association; membership in the American Academy of Arts and Sciences and the National Academy of Sciences; a D.Sc. from the University of Maryland in 1952; and an honorary M.D. from the University of Leiden in 1962, at the time of the XXII international Congress of Physiological Sciences.

The Ralph W. Gerard Prize in Neuroscience honors an outstanding scientist who has made significant contributions to neuroscience throughout his or her career.

Bibliography
Gerard wrote some 500 scientific papers and nine books, investigating the biology of language, ethics, biology and cultural evolution, education, and the impact of science on public policies. His nine books include:
Unresting Cells (1940)
Body Functions (1941)
Methods in Medical Research (1950)
Food For Life (1952)
Mirror to Physiology (1958)
Psychopharmacology; the Problem of Evaluation, (with Cole)(1959)

He also authored many research and review articles, including:
R.W. Gerard, d Hill & Y. Zotterman, The effect of frequency of simulations on the heat production of the nerve, in: J. Physiol. 63, pp. 130–43 (1927)
R.W. Gerard & Otto Meyerhoff, Studies on nerve metabolism. III. Chemismus and intermediarprozess, in: Biochem. Z. 191, pp. 125–46 (1927)
E.G. Holmes & R.W. Gerard, Studies on nerve metabolism: Carbohydrate metabolism of resting mammalian nerve, in: Biochem J., 23, pp. 738–47 (1929)
G. Ling & R.W. Gerard, The normal membrane potential of frog sartorius fibers, in: J. Cell. Comp. Physiol., 34, pp. 383–96 (1949)
L.G. Abood, R.W. Gerard, J. Banks & R.D. Tschirgi, Substrate and enzyme distribution in cells and cell fractions of the nervous system, in: Am. J. Physiol. 168, pp. 728–38 (1952)
L.G. Abood, R.W. Gerard & S. Ochs, Electrical stimulation of metabolism of homogenates and particulates, in: Am. J. Physiol. 171, pp. 134–9 (1952)
R.W. Gerard, By-ways of the investigator: thoughts on becoming an elder statesman. Past president's address, in: Am. J. Physiol. 171, pp. 695–703 (1952)
R.W. Gerard, Prefatory chapter: the organization of science, in: Annu. Rev. Physiol., 14, pp. 1–12 (1952)
R.W. Gerard, Central excitation and inhibition, in: Cybernetics, Heinz von Foerster & Margaret Mead (ed.), pp. 127–50. Newe York: Joshiah Macy Jr. Foundations (1953)
H.P. Jenerick & R.W. Gerard, Membrane potential and threshold of single muscle fibers, in: J. Cell. Comp. Physiol., 42, pp. 79–102 (1953)
Gerard, R.W., Clyde Kluckhohn, Anatol Rapoport, Biological and cultural evolution: Some analogies and explorations, in: Behavioral Science 1, pp. 6–34 (1953)
R.W. Gerard, International physiology. in: Physiologist 6, pp. 332–4 (1963).

References

Further reading
W.O. Fenn, History of the American Physiological Society: The Third Quarter Century, 1937–1962. Washington, DC. in: Am. Physiol. Soc., pp. 23–6 (1963)
B. Libet & Orr E. Reynolds R. W. Gerard, born October 7, 1900 - died February 17, 1974. in: J. Neurophysiol. 37: 828–829, 1974. Reprint in: Physiologist 17, pp. 165–8 (1974)
Obituary Ralph Waldo Gerard, in: Behavioral Science, Volume 20, Issue 1, pp. 1–8 (1974)
Anonymous, Ralph W. Gerard (1900-1974), in: Physiologist 23(1): 3 (1980)
Seymour S. Ketty, Ralph Waldo Gerard, October 7, 1900 - February 17, 1974, in: Biographical Memoirs V.53, National Academy of Sciences, p. 178 (1982).

External links
National Academy of Sciences Biographical Memoir
Ralph W. Gerard (1900-1974), in: The Physiologist'', 23(1): 3, 1980
Guide to the Ralph Waldo Gerard Papers. Special Collections and Archives, The UC Irvine Libraries, Irvine, California
Society for Neuroscience, Ralph W. Gerard Prize in Neuroscience, website.

1900 births
1974 deaths
American neuroscientists
History of neuroscience
American systems scientists
University of California, Irvine faculty
University of Chicago faculty
University of Michigan faculty
Neurophysiologists
Center for Advanced Study in the Behavioral Sciences fellows
Officers of the Order of the White Lion